The 2020 St Kilda Football Club season was the 124th in the club's history. Coached by Brett Ratten and captained by Jarryn Geary, they competed in the AFL's 2020 Toyota Premiership Season.

2019 off-season list changes

Retirements and delistings

Trades
The Saints began the  2019 trade period with a significant amount of work to do, following at least four players requesting to join the club. Bradley Hill (Fremantle), Paddy Ryder (Port Adelaide), Dougal Howard (Port Adelaide) and Zak Jones (Sydney) all told their respective clubs of their desire to be traded to the Saints at the end of the 2019 season. The Saints also discussed at trading out four-time best and fairest winner Jack Steven, widely rumoured to desire a move to Geelong for personal reasons, while many in the media reported that Josh Bruce was interested in a trade to the Western Bulldogs. Richmond's Dan Butler and Port Adelaide's Sam Gray have also expressed interest in being traded to the Saints.

The Saints began the trade period holding picks 6, 59, 76 and 82.

Free agents 
On 22 November 2019, the Saints acquired former Geelong ruckman Ryan Abbott as a delisted free-agent.

Draft 
At the 2019 National Draft on 28 November 2019, the Saints selected Ryan Byrnes (pick 52) and Leo Connolly (Pick 64). At the 2019 Rookie Draft St Kilda used pick five to draft Jack Bell.

2020 squad change summary 
In:

Out:

Pre-season 
The Saints secured the opportunity to hold opening game of the pre-season Marsh Community Series by hosting the first senior game in more than 25 years at their spiritual home of Moorabbin Oval (currently known as RSEA Park due to naming sponsorship). The Saints' played a practice game a week later, also again the Hawks. The Saints' second pre-season series game saw the team travel to the regional town of Morwell in the La Trobe Valley of East Gippsland in south-eastern Victoria.

Regular season 

The Saints were scheduled to play a match in Shanghai in June against Port Adelaide, however, ahead of the 2020 season the AFL announced that the game had been moved to Melbourne due to the COVID-19 pandemic.  The fixture change will see the Saints play the Power at Docklands Stadium in Round 12 on 7 June, as opposed to in Shanghai in Round 11. As the coronavirus situation deteriorated in early March, the AFL determined that no spectators would be permitted to attend games until further notice. On 22 March, at the conclusion of Round 1, the AFL determined to suspend the remainder season until further notice due to the coronavirus situation. In mid-May, the AFL announced that the resumption of the 2020 season would begin on 11 June, with non-contact training to be permitted from the 18th and contact training to be permissible from 25 May.

Due to the COVID-19 pandemic, the AFL announced that the 2020 fixture would be reduced from 23 rounds to 17. The first five rounds of the revised 2020 AFL fixture were announced by the AFL on 25 May. Due to COVID-19, players are required to follow strict guidelines and avoid contact with the wider public as part of the conditions set by the government and AFL to allow resumption of the competition. Rounds six and seven are expected to be announced following the conclusion of Round three. On 29 June the AFL announced that the Saints' round 5 game with Carlton was rescheduled from Saturday 4th (at the MCG) to Thursday 2 June (at Docklands). This was due to additional restrictions being placed on Victorian teams flying to Queensland following a spike in Coronavirus cases in Victoria in late June, resulting in the need to again adjust the fixture. On 3 July the AFL announced a significant fixture change along with a relocation of the Saints to a 'hub' in the Queensland region of Noosa, possibly for the remainder of the season. This was due to a deteriorating COVID-19 situation in Victoria. The Saints' revised round six and seven fixtures (against Geelong at the Docklands on the 9th and Port Adelaide on the 19th also at Docklands) were replaced with matches against Fremantle and Adelaide in Queensland and South Australia respectively. The change in fixture coincided with the  relocation of all 10 Victorian teams to 'hubs' in Sydney and south-east Queensland. Due to the status of the Saints of a relatively young side, with few players having spouses or children, it was theorised that the temporary relocation would give them an edge over older sides, whose players had been demoralised as a result of having to leave their families behind In order to continue playing. On Monday 13 July, the AFL announced the Round 8 fixture. On 24 July the Saints announced that veteran defender Nathan Brown would leave the team's Queensland hub to return to Melbourne for family reasons. Brown's decision was fully supported by the club with Simon Lethlean saying that "he is such a respected member of our team and the spiritual leader of the connection, culture and standards that we are building here at the Saints. The players and staff love the big fella and we will miss him – but he has made the right call for him and his family, and we are very proud of him for that."

Ladder

Revised 2020 AFL fixture  

 Fixture as at 14 August 2020

Notes:
aFrom round 1 to round 5, all matches were played behind closed doors due to the COVID-19 pandemic.

2020 Finals Series 

The Saints qualified for finals having finished the regular season in 6th place on the premiership ladder. The ladder position also allowed the Saints to 'host' the Second Elimination Final, with the Saints negotiating to play at the Gabba despite reports of a league desire to play the game at the Adelaide Oval. "We have played a lot footy at the Gabba this season and, given where we are currently based in Noosa, it was certainly our preference. Saying that, we were prepared to play wherever the game was fixtured and I know internally with the discussions I have had with players and coaches, that was certainly the mindset of the group," CEO Matt Finnis stated. Teams who finish the regular season in positions five to eight on the ladder compete in a 'sudden death' elimination final. The Saints won the Second Elimination Final against the Western Bulldogs, qualifying for a Semi Final place. Although kicking 2 goals, tapping 20 hit-outs and being involved in seven scoring attempts in a best-on-ground performance, Paddy Ryder injured his hamstring in the dying minutes of the game; the injury was deemed severe enough to rule Ryder out for the remainder of the year in a serious blow for the Saints.The Saints will face Richmond in the Semi Final after the Tigers lost to Brisbane in their Qualifying Final. As Richmond finished in third place on the ladder, the Tigers had the right to select the Queensland-based venue for their 'home' final and chose Carrara Stadium on the Gold Coast. Defender Jake Carlisle left the Saints' quarantine hub on 5 October to be present for the birth of his third child. Carlisle had been one of his side's best players in the win over the Bulldogs. Of Carlisle's departure (which will rule him out for he remainder of the season), Chief Operating Officer Simon Lethlean said the club was fully supportive of the decision: "we thank Jake for staying as long as he possibly could before heading to NSW to be with Mel for the birth.  He has been away from his young family for a number of months now and we thank him for making that sacrifice. We support him in this decision and wish Jake, Mel, Nash and Layker all the best in the coming weeks." Following the win against the Western Bulldogs, defender Ben Long was charged with 'Engaging in Rough Conduct' against the Bulldogs' Jack Macrae by the Match Review Panel who assessed the incident as Careless Conduct, Medium Impact and High Contact and was offered a one match suspension. The Saints appealed the ruling, however, it was upheld by the AFL Tribunal. The Saints appealed again to the AFL Appeals Board, however despite a two-hour hearing and 30-minute deliberation this also failed with Long ultimately handed a one-match sanction. As a result of the three forced changes, Shane Savage, Josh Battle and Jonathan Marsh were added to the squad for the semi final against Richmond. The Saints were ultimately defeated by Richmond by 31-points who dominated scores from stoppages and centre clearances, normally not a trait of 2019 premiers.

Original AFL fixture (pre-Covid19)

Post-Season Awards and Accolades 
Hunter Clark (half back), Nick Coffield (interchange) and Max King (full forward) were selected for the AFL Players' Association 22Under22 side which recognises the best players aged 22 and under throughout the course of the season. Coffield took a team-high 100 marks from his 16 games, completing the season as one of only five players – and the youngest – to make 100. Coffield topped St Kilda's total intercepts (86) and intercept marks (34), finished equal-second for rebound-50s (47) alongside Dougal Howard and overall second for effective disposals (202). Clark finished top-three for his side's disposals (274) and ground-ball gets (85) and was also voted in over 80 per cent of the total fan-submitted 22Under22 teams. King finished runner-up in the Saints’ goalkicking (20) and outright first for marks inside-50 (26) and earned a Rising Star nomination in round 12 against Essendon. Jack Steele finished equal third (with Melbourne's Christian Petracca) in the Brownlow Medal after polling votes in nine games and earning best on ground in the matches against Carlton, Adelaide, Port Adelaide and Gold Coast.

Players and staff 

<noinclude>

Notes
 Key
 H ^ Home match.
 A ^ Away match.

 Notes
Collingwood's scores are indicated in bold font.

References

External links
 
 Listing of St Kilda game results in 2020

St Kilda Football Club seasons
2020 Australian Football League season